Zokkomon  is an 2011 Indian Hindi-language superhero film released by Disney World Cinema, written and directed by Satyajit Bhatkal. Starring Darsheel Safary in the lead role, Zokkomon is Disney's fourth involvement in a production for the Indian market (after the computer-animated Roadside Romeo, Tollywood movie Anaganaga O Dheerudu and the live-action Do Dooni Chaar). The music has been composed by Shankar–Ehsaan–Loy. The film received mixed to positive reviews from critics and audiences alike who praised the performances, most notably Safary, Fadnis, and Kher but had criticism towards the story and noted that the film didn't make full use of its potential.

Plot 
Kunal (Safary), an orphaned boy, discovers how cruel life is when he is abandoned by his heartless uncle, Deshraj Kumar (Kher). Left to fend for himself, Kunal soon realizes the hero within and begins his epic journey of adventure and transformation to become Zokkomon.

Cast
 Darsheel Safary as Kunal Kumar / Zokkomon
 Manjari Fadnis as Kittu
 Anupam Kher as Deshraj Kumar (Kunal's uncle)
 Sheeba Chaddha as Rajrani Kumar (Kunal’s aunt)
 Atisha Naik as Arju's Mother
 S. M. Zaheer as Dr. Vivek Roy

Soundtrack
The music is composed by Shankar–Ehsaan–Loy. Lyrics are penned by Ramesh, Lakshmi, and Javed Akhtar

Track listing

Release
The film was originally scheduled for release on 7 May 2010, but due to scheduling conflicts with Bumm Bumm Bole, another film starring Safary, the release date was moved to 22 April 2011.

Home media
The film was released by Buena Vista Home Entertainment on DVD, digital Download, and on demand on 26 July 2011.

Reception

Critical response 
Zokkomon received mostly favorable reviews from film critics. Kevin Thomas of Los Angeles Times gave the film 4 out of 5, describing the film as a "lively and engaging family film" that has "more substance and cohesiveness than much Bollywood fare."   Robert Koehler of Variety calls the production package under Satyajit Bhatkal's direction "thoroughly pro," while Kirk Honeycutt of The Hollywood Reporter says that the first live-action film from Disney Studios India is "designed to give Indian kids their first superhero."

Conversely, Shubhra Gupta of The Indian Express gave the film 2 stars out of 5, writing ″Too bad Zokkomon doesn't make full use of its potential.″ Anuj Kumar in his negative review for The Hindu called the film ″Low on IQ, high on saccharine!″. He further wrote ″We never get to know the logic behind rechristening Kunal Zokkomon in a place where people speak chaste Hindi and the kids are not shown watching any cartoon channel. A name like Zokkomon sounds out of place in such territory, but Bhatkal never substantiates it in the script. Perhaps Disney wants to promote Zokkomon as a long-lost Indian cousin of Doraemon or Pokemon if the film does well. But for now, it comes across as a misplaced marketing move. Darsheel is the best thing about the film. Kher hams big time and Manjari overdoes the cute act.″

References

External links
  

2010s Hindi-language films
2010s Indian superhero films
2010s action adventure films
Child superheroes
Film superheroes
Indian action adventure films
Walt Disney Pictures films
Films about orphans
Films about child abuse
India in fiction
Films shot in India
Films set in India
Indian films about revenge
UTV Motion Pictures films
Disney India films